Grace Coolidge Creek is a stream in the U.S. state of South Dakota.

Grace Coolidge Creek has the name of First Lady Grace Coolidge, who paid a visit to South Dakota in 1927.

See also
List of rivers of South Dakota

References

Rivers of Custer County, South Dakota
Rivers of South Dakota